Kalkandereh may refer to:

 Kalkandere, a town in Turkey
 Tetovo, a city in Macedonia, formerly known as Kalkandelen